Khalid Bin Vilayat is a Pakistani politician who had been a Member of the Provincial Assembly of Sindh, from May 2013 to May 2018.

Early life and education
He was born on 16 July 1967 in Karachi.

He has a degree of Bachelors in Commerce, a degree of Master of Arts in Political Science and a degree of Bachelor of Laws, all from Karachi University.

Political career

He was elected to the Provincial Assembly of Sindh as a candidate of Mutahida Quami Movement from Constituency PS-105 KARACHI-XVII in 2013 Pakistani general election. In August 2016, he quit MQM to joined Pak Sarzameen Party.

References

Living people
Sindh MPAs 2013–2018
1967 births
Muttahida Qaumi Movement politicians